= Dutch Hockey Hall of Fame =

The Dutch Hockey Hall of Fame located in the Netherlands serves to honor those individuals that have contributed to the sport of ice hockey in the Netherlands.
